Serge Nadaud (May 14, 1906 – July 18, 1995) was a Russian Empire-born French stage and film actor. He was born Eugene Rabinowitch to a Jewish family in Bakhmut which was then part of the Russian Empire. Sometime after the Russian Revolution of 1917 his family emigrated to France and settled there. He was a noted voice actor, dubbing foreign films for release in France.

Selected filmography
 The Phantom Gondola (1936)
 The Emigrant (1940)
 Forbidden to the Public (1949)
 Under the Sky of Paris (1951)

External links 
 

1906 births
1995 deaths
French male stage actors
French male film actors
People from Bakhmut
Russian Jews
Soviet emigrants to France
20th-century French male actors